Series 2042 is a diesel locomotive series on Croatian Railways.

This series is not substantively different from the series 2041, except that they have a stronger engine. With the upgrade in motor, this locomotives changed the traction behavior. These are four-axle locomotives with every axle separately powered. This series is built for hauling of lighter freight trains and for heavy maneuvering.

External links 
 2042 at zeljeznice.net 

2042
Đuro Đaković (company)
Brissonneau and Lotz locomotives
Standard gauge locomotives of Croatia
Standard gauge locomotives of Yugoslavia
Diesel-electric locomotives of Yugoslavia

Freight locomotives